Mišić is a Serbian, Bosnian, Togolese, Croatian surname, derived from the male given name Mišo, or from the singular meaning "small mouse" and "muscle". It may refer to:

Aleksandar Mišić (1891-1941), Serbian military commander
Alojzije Mišić (1859–1942), Bosnian Croat Catholic bishop
Bojan Mišić (born 1978), Serbian footballer
Božidar Mišić (born 1902), first Serbian professional watch maker
Biljana Mišić (born 1983), Serbian actress
Janko Mišić (1900–1929), Yugoslav politician
Jelena Mišić, Yugoslav-Canadian computer scientist
Josip Mišić (born 1986), Croatian footballer
Josip Mišić (born 1994), Croatian footballer
Katarina Mišić (born 1976), Serbian tennis coach
Matija Mišić (born 1992), Croatian footballer
Milana Misic (born 1970), Finnish singer of partly Croatian descent
Petar Mišić (1863-1921), Serbian and Yugoslav general
Petar Mišić (born 1994), Croatian footballer
Saša Mišić (born 1987), Serbian footballer
Saša Mišić (born 1987), Montenegrin water polo player
Siniša Mišić (born 1961), Serbian historian
Mijo Mišić (1965-2022), Bosnian-Togolese professional boxer 
Slobodan Misic-Brenda (born 1942),  Canadian handball coach and author
Živojin Mišić (1855–1921), Serbian and early Yugoslav general
Živorad Mišić (born 1986), Serbian footballer

See also
Mišović, surname
Mišević, settlement in Serbia

Serbian surnames
Croatian surnames
Bosnian surnames
Patronymic surnames
Surnames from given names